Open educational resources in Canada are the various initiatives related to open education, open educational resources (OER), open pedagogies (OEP), open educational practices (OEP), and open scholarship that are established nationally and provincially across Canadian K-12 and higher education sectors, and where Canadian based inititatives extend to international collaborations.

In Canada, education is exclusively a provincial or territorial responsibility, though the federal government can intervene in areas relevant to open education. The UNESCO 2021 Paris OER Declaration, the 2017 Lubjiana OER Action Plan, and the signing of the 2019 UNESCO OER Recommendations, are seen as driving forces for the movement toward OER development, adoption, and use within the provincial and territorial education systems.

Initiatives 
The open educational resources (OER) movement in Canada can be categorized in different ways, from type of initiative to geographical location to institutional initiative. OER in Canada is focused on policy, funding, resource production, resource management, and OER sharing. The initiatives described below are categorized according to global, national, provincial, and local OER initiatives. Several OER initiatives in Canada feature national and international collaboration.

National and International Initiatives

OER universitas 
OER universitas (OERu) offers free online university courses in collaboration with Canadian partners, offering formal credentials from the partner institutions. OERu is a consortium of more than 36 institutions and several organizations on five continents. It is dedicated to widening access and reducing the cost of post-secondary education for learners by providing OER pathways to achieve formal credentials. There are seven members of the OERu in Canada: three universities (Athabasca in Alberta and Thompson Rivers and Kwantlen in British Columbia); one community college (Portage College in Alberta); and three organisations (BCcampus, eCampus Alberta, and Contact North in Ontario).

Pan-Canadian Initiatives

Open data 
The Canadian government initiated an open data pilot project in 2012 using an open government licence, similar to the Creative Commons (CC) attribution non-commercial licence (CC BY-NC), allowing for remixing and non-commercial uses. In April 2014 Industry Canada launched Digital Canada150, which aimed to support "connecting, and protecting Canadians, economic opportunities, digital government and Canadian content." The Canadian government provides a portal for accessing open data, services, and archived sources.

Open Networks 
CANARIE is a non-profit, federally funded corporation that manages and develops digital research infrastructure for research and education, operating the backbone network of Canada's National Research and Education Network (CNREN). This connects Canadian research in open networks such as the Global Research and Education Network. Along with the National Research Council's (NRC) Knowledge Management and the Canadian Association of Research Libraries. CANARIE supports Research Data Canada in meeting researcher needs in the coordination and promotion of data management. The strategy includes developing open science, open access to citizen science data collections from across Canada, and open data to facilitate easy and open access to publications and related data resulting from federally funded research.

Creative Commons Canada 
The creation and use of OER benefits from the development and use of Creative Commons (CC) licences, which provide the legal framework to share these resources. A non-profit organization, Creative Common Canada (CC Canada) supports a legal and technical infrastructure for openness. As a member of the global network, CC Canada began as a collaborative initiative with input from the Canadian Internet Policy and Public Interest Clinic (CIPPIC) at the University of Ottawa, BCcampus, and Athabasca University (AU). In addition to helping users choose licences and find Creative Commons-licensed work, CC Canada is a proponent of open government and the philosophy that government data should be accessible, shareable and reusable under open licences by everyone. Canadian Ryan Merkley was CEO of Creative Commons worldwide from 2014 until 2019.

Council of Ministers of Education of Canada 
The Council of Ministers of Education of Canada (CMEC) is an organization of 13 provincial and territorial ministries of education. In response to UNESCO's 2012 Paris Declaration on OER, CMEC first discussed OER at a national meeting in 2012. The Ministers reaffirmed their commitment to open access and to adapt educational practices to the new realities of information sharing. After further discussions in 2013, the ministers unanimously endorsed the Paris Declaration. This has played an important role in the growing support for OER across Canada and has been instrumental in the establishment of OER initiatives in the western provinces.

Tri-agency open access policy 
The three Canadian research-funding agencies (Tri-Agency) – the Canadian Institutes of Health Research (CIHR), the Natural Sciences and Engineering Research Council of Canada (NSERC) and the Social Sciences and Humanities Research Council of Canada (SSHRC) – have agreed on policies that support open access in scholarly publications. While each agency supports knowledge sharing and research collaboration, both domestically and internationally, there are differing guidelines for the publication of open resources from research projects. Projects funded by the Tri-Agency hold a requirement that research publications are written in an open, Creative Commons licensed format. Since January 1, 2008, CIHR adopted the policy on open access of scholarship and publication. NSERC and SSHRC adopted this policy on May 1, 2015.

Provincial Initiatives

BCcampus 
BCcampus, arguably the most-active collaborative Canadian organization in the open practices arena, is a publicly funded service that has turned to open concepts and methods to create a sustainable approach to online learning for the public post-secondary institutions of British Columbia (BC). BCcampus was created to enhance students' ability not only to identify, choose, register for and take courses, but also to apply any academic credits earned to credentials at a selected home institution. It was intended to benefit institutions through the rationalization of demand for academic opportunities from students with the supply of online courses from BC's public post-secondary institutions.

BCcampus has been the leader in Canada in promoting OER with CMEC. BCcampus played a major role in the decision by the BC Ministry of Advanced Education, Innovation and Technology to support and implement the Open Textbook Project, which started with a commitment to provide 40 open textbooks at the post-secondary level and is now committed to 60. BCcampus hosted a working forum on OER for senior post-secondary institution representatives in Vancouver in October 2012, with the objective of developing a common understanding of what OER could mean for the province and of building a shared vision of how to develop and use the resources. The session also studied ways that BC could take advantage of the promise of OER and, specifically, of open textbooks.

The BCcampus Shareable Online Learning Resources repository (SOL*R) enables the licensing of, contribution to, and access to free online teaching and learning resources. Other BCcampus initiatives are also underway in support of OER, including: the implementation of an initiative around apprenticeships for the trades, in partnership with BC's Industry Training Authority; and work with the North American Network of Science Labs Online (NANSLO) to build on the success of the Remote Web-based Science Laboratory (RWSL) and open educational science courseware.

Alberta OER

The Campus Alberta Open Educational Resources (ABOER) Initiative was a 3-year $2 million government-funded initiative designed to assist with reducing the costs of a post-secondary education for students; and to provide students and faculty members with flexibility, offering updated, relevant content for learning. In March 2013, the Alberta Ministry of Innovation and Advanced Education entered a Memorandum of Understanding (MOU) with BC and Saskatchewan to collaborate on the development of common OER within their respective advanced-education sectors, recognizing the benefits of sharing existing OER with a focus on mutual areas of interest. This MOU was foundational to the establishment of the ABOER Initiative. Through partnerships with BCcampus, the initiative launched an ABOER Collection within SOL*R for open educational resources created or adapted by Albertans.

The ABOER Initiative funded over forty grant projects in Alberta across 31 publicly funded post-secondary institutions. In March 2017, program evaluation reported $482,000 in cost savings after one term (fall 2016) of open textbook adoption and forecasted cost savings of $5.5 million over five years. A broader evaluation of cost savings including the adoption of ABOER-funded OER development and results of awareness initiatives remains to be evaluated. The report indicates an estimated one year of OER adoption to recuperate the investment of resource development.

eCampus Alberta (closed March 2017) funded the development of an OER awareness course and peer review of BCcampus OER.

The work of the ABOER Initiative and eCampus Alberta continued through a provincial OER Community of Practice (CoP), intended to encourage open educational practices in Alberta. In May 2017, University of Alberta hosted the first Alberta OER Summit.

eCampusOntario

eCampusOntario.ca is the primary face of the Ontario Online Learning Consortium (OOLC), a not-for-profit corporation whose membership is composed of all publicly funded colleges and universities in Ontario, and whose funding comes from the Government of Ontario.  eCampus Ontario is led by CEO, David Porter. With a background in leading the open education movement in British Columbia with SFU, BCcampus, and BCIT, eCampus Ontario has already begun to bring OER and practices to the forefront of Ontario's education system. OER initiatives from eCampus Ontario include $2.6 million in open research and innovation funding, an open textbook library, and a collaborative project with Ryerson University to create an open publishing platform.

Contact North 
Contact North (CN) is a non-profit organization supporting Ontario's distance education and training network. It provides programming from public colleges, universities and schools with a focus on smaller towns, rural and remote communities. In 2011, Contact North published "Open Educational Resources (OER) Opportunities for Ontario", a major position paper stating the case for a provincial OER initiative. Contact North has also published an OER primer as a video series. Through their Study Online learning portal, Contact North provides a searchable database of over 2600 online cerficate programs, over 42,500 online courses, and variety of open access courses to suit all learners. Contact North also provides up-to-date information and webinars for faculty and instructors through their Teach Online portal.

Téléuniversité du Québec (TÉLUQ) 
TÉLUQ's policies on the dissemination of educational resources were presented in "Politique de gestion de la diffusion des ressources d'enseignement et d'apprentissage" (REA). These policies relate to learning content in general and could include OER, but are also designed for proprietary content. Because TÉLUQ faculty retain the intellectual property of all original material they produce for teaching, institutional policy has limited impact on what professors do with their material. The Laboratoire en Informatique Cognitive et Environnements de Formation (LICEF) is a research centre at TÉLUQ, and hosts the Banques des ressources éducatives en réseau (brer), a repository of French-language OER.

Institutional initiatives 
While not specific to a single Canadian university initiative, or specifically related to the production or curation of OER, the Canadian Virtual University can be seen as a forerunner to the open resources initiative currently being done in Canadian higher education institutions. Also, not specific to a single university context, open publications are produced through the initiative and support by many Canadian higher education locations. These include the International Review of Research in Open and Distributed Learning, Canadian Journal of Learning and Technology, and the International Journal of e-Learning and Distance Education.

Athabasca University 
There has been, and continues to be, significant OER activity at Athabasca University (AU). It was the first university in Canada to join the OpenCourseWare Consortium (now the Open Education Consortium [OEC]) and, as of 2014, remains the only Canadian institutional member. The Province of Alberta and AU hosted the 2015 OEC conference in Banff, with over 250 delegates from more than 26 countries. AU was also given an OEC ACE Award in 2014 for its highly visible OER research website, the OER Knowledge Cloud.

AU is home to the Technology Enhanced Knowledge Research Institute (TEKRI) and the UNESCO/COL/ICDE Chair in OER, both of which promote research into, and the implementation of, OER at institutional, national, and international levels. The OER Chair is also a member of the board of the OER Foundation, which hosts the OER universitas (OERu).

AU's adoption of open access began with the creation of the scholarly journal International Review of Research in Open and Distributed Learning (IRRODL) in 1999, and continued in 2005 with the implementation of AUSpace, a DSpace repository of scholarly articles, theses and other documents produced within the AU community. AUPress was the first open access university press in Canada, starting in 2010, and offers over 100 volumes. Other AU open initiatives include participating in workshops and conferences, conducting a mapping of open educational activities with POERUP (policies for OER uptake) and eMundus Europrojects, and supporting GO-GN, the Global OER Graduate Network.

Thompson Rivers University Open Learning 
Thompson Rivers University (TRU) houses the former BC Open University (which existed under the BC Open Learning Agency, and before that as the Open Learning Institute) as its distance education wing, called TRU Open Learning. It operates under an open admission legislative mandate included in the Thompson Rivers University Act and offers courses and programs ranging from adult basic education (ABE) to master's degrees. TRU Open Learning has worked with several OERu partner institutions to provide initial prototype courses to be released as OER. TRU Open Learning has a robust system for prior learning assessment and recognition (PLAR) that includes challenge examinations and transfer of credit, as well as an Educational Credit Bank that maintains a list of over 50 corporate, professional and continuing education courses and programs that have been pre-approved for specific course credit. This makes it a key partner for OER initiatives nationally and internationally. TRU Open Learning initiated the Prior Learning International Research Consortium (PLIRC) to promote research into PLAR among universities around the world.

OCAD University 
The Inclusive Design Research Centre (IDRC), a research and development centre at OCAD University (formerly the Ontario College of Art and Design), consists of an international community of open practice advocates. The learning technologies and products that have been developed at by IDRC are distributed under the GNU General Public Licence. This means that the code is open source and requires users to share products under the same liberal licensing.

A key project, FLOE (Flexible Learning for Open Education), is currently one of the IDRC's biggest initiatives. It has received substantial funding from the Hewlett Foundation and the European Commission. FLOE takes advantage of the fact that the centre has a set of curricula that is openly licensed and can be repurposed and re-used to make content accessible. This makes FLOE heavily dependent on OER, which presents an optimal learning environment to meet the needs of all learners, including those with disabilities. FLOE advances the strengths and values of open education and encourages pedagogical and technical innovation. It also promotes OER for content portability, ease of updating, internationalization and localization, content re-use and repurposing, and more efficient and effective content discovery. FLOE's work is international and broad. For example, to support adoption in Africa and other areas where mobile devices are more prevalent than Internet access, FLOE creates tools and services for delivery as OER via audio, text messages, and the small screens found on popular cellphones. These same tools and services are intended to support accessibility through inclusive design.

Massive open online courses 

Massive open online courses (MOOCs) are Canadian in origin. The name dates to an experimental course led by George Siemens at the University of Manitoba and Stephen Downes at the National Research Council in 2008 (Tamburri, 2014). They taught a regular online university credit course, "Connectivism and Connective Knowledge", with 25 students; and more than 2,200 additional learners joined the course online. As Siemens reports, this course, delivered in 2008, was the first MOOC to combine open content with open teaching. This concept was developed from the idea of an open wiki pioneered by David A. Wiley at Utah State University and a 2007 open-boundary graduate course facilitated by Dr. Alec Couros at the University of Regina, in which 20 registered students were joined by approximately 200 non-credit international students.

See also 
 Open access in Canada
 Open data in Canada
 Open educational practices in Australia
 Open access in New Zealand

Sources

External links 

 Canada's National Research and Education Network (CNREN)
Global Research and Education Network
Research Data Canada 
Citizen science data collections from across Canada

References 

Free content from UNESCO
Education in Canada
Open educational resources
Educational technology
Educational materials